Young Germany was a group of German writers which existed from about 1830 to 1850. It was essentially a youth ideology, similar to those that had swept France, Ireland, the United States and Italy. Its main proponents were Karl Gutzkow, Heinrich Laube, Theodor Mundt and Ludolf Wienbarg; Heinrich Heine, Ludwig Börne and Georg Büchner were also considered part of the movement. The wider group included Willibald Alexis, Adolf Glassbrenner, Gustav Kühne, Max Waldau and Georg Herwegh.

Overview
The writers of Young Germany were against what they perceived as of "absolutism" in politics and "obscurantism" in religion. They maintained the principles of democracy, socialism, and rationalism. Among the many things they advocated were: separation of church and state, the emancipation of the Jews, and the raising of the political and social position of women. During a time of political unrest in Europe, Young Germany was regarded as dangerous by many politicians due to its progressive viewpoint. During December 1835 the Frankfurt Bundestag banned the publication in Germany of many authors associated with the movement, namely Heine, Gutzkow, Laube, Mundt, and Wienbarg. In their reasoning, they explained that the Young Germans were attempting to “attack the Christian religion in the most impudent way, degrade existing conditions and destroy all discipline and morality with belletristic writings accessible to all classes of readers.”

The ideology produced poets, thinkers and journalists, all of whom reacted against the introspection and particularism of Romanticism in the national literature, which had resulted in a total separation of literature from the actualities of life. The Romantic Movement was considered apolitical, lacking the activism that Germany's burgeoning intelligentsia required. As a result of the decades of compulsory school attendance in German states, mass literacy meant an excess of educated males which the establishment could not subsume. Thus in the 1830s, with the advantage of inexpensive printing presses, there was a rush of educated males into the so-called “free professions.”

Notes

References
 
In German:
 Jost Hermand (edit.): Das Junge Deutschland. Texte und Dokumente. Stuttgart: Reclam 1966 u.ö. (RUB 8795), 
 Wulf Wülfing: Junges Deutschland. Texte - Kontexte, Abbildungen, Kommentar. Munich: Carl Hanser 1978 (Reihe Hanser 244), 
 Manfred Schneider: Die kranke schöne Seele der Revolution. Heine, Börne, das Junge Deutschland, Marx und Engels. Bodenheim: Athenaeum 1980.
 Hartmut Steinecke: Literaturkritik des Jungen Deutschland. Entwicklungen – Tendenzen – Texte. Berlin: Erich Schmidt 1982, 
 Wulf Wülfing: Schlagworte des Jungen Deutschland. Mit einer Einführung in die Schlagwortforschung. Berlin: Erich Schmidt 1982 (Philologische Studien und Quellen 106), 
 Helmut Koopmann: Das Junge Deutschland. Eine Einführung. Darmstadt: Wiss. Buchgesellschaft 1993, 
 Lothar Ehrlich, Hartmut Steinecke, Michael Vogt (eds.): Vormärz und Klassik. Bielefeld: Aisthesis 1999 (Vormärz-Studien I), 
 Wolfgang Bunzel, Peter Stein, Florian Vaßen (eds.): Romantik und Vormärz. Zur Archäologie literarischer Kommunikation in der ersten Hälfte des 19. Jahrhunderts. Bielefeld: Aisthesis 2003 (Vormärz-Studien X), 
 Georg Büchner: Werke und Briefe – Nach der historisch-kritischen Ausgabe von Werner R. Lehmann, Hanser Verlag, Munich 1980. , p279

History of liberalism
19th-century German literature
Secret societies in Germany
German literary movements